Communauté d'agglomération Terre de Provence is the communauté d'agglomération, an intercommunal structure, covering the area around the town of Châteaurenard. It is located in the Bouches-du-Rhône department, in the Provence-Alpes-Côte d'Azur region, southeastern France. Created in 1996, its seat is in Eyragues. Its area is 265.9 km2. Its population was 59,775 in 2019.

Composition
The communauté d'agglomération consists of the following 13 communes:

Barbentane
Cabannes
Châteaurenard
Eyragues
Graveson
Maillane
Mollégès
Noves
Orgon
Plan-d'Orgon
Rognonas
Saint-Andiol
Verquières

References

Terre de Provence
Terre de Provence